Donald Mark Prince (April 5, 1938 – November 8, 2017) was an American professional baseball player. He had a seven-year (1958–1964) active career, but appeared in only one inning of one Major League Baseball game for the  Chicago Cubs.

Prince's Major League audition came after a mediocre 1962 season with the Cubs' Triple-A Salt Lake City Bees affiliate, where he won 10 of 24 decisions and had a high earned run average of 5.31, largely as a starting pitcher. In his one MLB game, he pitched in relief in the ninth inning of a 4–1 loss to the New York Mets at the Polo Grounds. He issued a base on balls to the first man he faced, Joe Christopher, then hit the next batter, Frank Thomas. But Jim Hickman got Prince off the hook by grounding into a 1-6-3 double play and Sammy Drake bounced out to second.

Prince then returned to the minor leagues for the 1963–1964 seasons before retiring from baseball.

In 1996, Prince was convicted in a murder-for-hire plot in the Federal District Court in South Carolina. Prince received a -year sentence for attempting to have two people murdered by an undercover police officer he believed to be a hit man.

Prince died November 8, 2017.

References

External links
Career record and playing statistics from Baseball Reference
 http://www.ca4.uscourts.gov/Opinions/Unpublished/974329.U.pdf

1938 births
2017 deaths
Amarillo Gold Sox players
Baseball players from North Carolina
Baseball players from South Carolina
Burlington Bees players
Campbell Fighting Camels baseball players
Chicago Cubs players
Fort Worth Cats players
Lancaster Red Roses players
Major League Baseball pitchers
People from Marion County, South Carolina
Salem Dodgers players
Salt Lake City Bees players
San Antonio Missions players
People from Bladen County, North Carolina
Paris Lakers players